Brandi Carlile is the debut album from American folk rock singer Brandi Carlile. It was released on July 12, 2005 by Red Ink Records.

Track listing
 "Follow" (Brandi Carlile, Tim Hanseroth) – 4:13
 "What Can I Say" (Tim Hanseroth) – 2:50
 "Closer to You" (Carlile, Tim Hanseroth) – 2:54
 "Throw It All Away" (Carlile, Tim Hanseroth) – 3:43
 "Happy" (Carlile) – 2:32
 "Someday Never Comes" (Carlile, Tim Hanseroth) – 2:47
 "Fall Apart Again" (Phil Hanseroth, Tim Hanseroth) – 3:37
 "In My Own Eyes" (Carlile) – 3:31
 "Gone" (Carlile, Phil Hanseroth, Tim Hanseroth) – 3:05
 "Tragedy" (Carlile) – 3:45

The 2006 re-release by Columbia Records included re-recordings of "Throw It All Away" and "What Can I Say," a version of "Tragedy" featuring cellist Phillip Peterson, and a live cover version of Elton John's "60 Years On".

Personnel

Musicians 

 Brandi Carlile – Guitar, Vocals, Producer, Engineer
 Phil Hanseroth – Bass, Vocals (background)
 Tim Hanseroth – Guitar, Vocals (background), Engineer
 Phillip Peterson – Strings
 Mark Pickerel – drums
 Glenn Slater – Keyboards
 Kevin Suggs – Pedal Steel

Other 

 Robbie Adams – Tracking
 Michael Barber – Executive Producer
 Kip Beelman – Engineer
 Tim Devine – A&R
 Autumn DeWilde – Photography
 Martin Feveyear – Mixing
 John Goodmanson - Producer, Engineer, Mixer
 Aimee MacAuley – Art Direction
 Vlado Meller – Mastering

2005 debut albums
Brandi Carlile albums
Columbia Records albums